Alfred Paul Dorjahn (11 July 1894 – 23 June 1986) was an American classicist. In 1924 he completed his PhD at the University of Chicago. His doctoral dissertation was The Athenian Political Amnesty of 403 BC.

References

External links
 Review of Political Forgiveness in old Athens. The Amnesty of 403BC by Dorjahn (Alfred P.), Cloché Paul, Revue belge de philologie et d'histoire, 1949, Volume 27, Numéro 1, pp. 221–223 

1894 births
1986 deaths
20th-century American historians
American male non-fiction writers
University of Chicago alumni
20th-century American male writers